Bansal is a surname of Indian origin. Among Agrawals, it is the name of a gotra (patrilineal clan).

People with the surname Bansal include:

 Binny Bansal, businessman and co-founder of Flipkart
 Harmeet Singh Bansal, Indian cricketer
 Jyoti Bansal, co-founder of AppDynamics
 Keshav Bansal, businessman and owner of Gujarat Lions, IPL Team
 Manju Bansal (born 1950), Indian biophysicist
 Narendra Bansal, founder of Intex Technologies
 Naresh Bansal, Member Rajyasabha
 Pawan Kumar Bansal (born 1948), Indian politician
 Pratima Bansal, Canadian economist
 Preeta D. Bansal (born 1965), American lawyer
 Rohit Bansal, businessman and co-founder of Snapdeal
 S. K. Bansal (born 1940), Indian cricket umpire
 Sachin Bansal, businessman and co-founder of Flipkart
 Sanju Bansal, American businessman
 Smita Bansal (born 1967), Indian actress
 Suresh Bansal, member of the 16th Legislative Assembly of Uttar Pradesh of India
 Vinod Kumar Bansal, Indian businessman
 Vishesh Bansal, Indian actor
 Pawan Bansal, Bansal Holidays Rewari

References

Gotras of Agarwal
Agrawal
Indian surnames
Social groups of India